William Flintoff Humphrey (November 13, 1860 – June 5, 1928) was a Canadian politician.

Biography
William F. Humphrey was born in Moncton on November 13, 1860. He married E. Bessie Wallace on April 16, 1885 and they had five children.

He served in the Legislative Assembly of New Brunswick from 1899 to 1903 and from 1912 to 1917 as an independent member. He died in 1928.

References 

1860 births
1928 deaths
Members of the Legislative Assembly of New Brunswick
People from Moncton